Lakhau may refer to:

 Lakhau, Assam, a village in Sibsagar district, Assam, India
 Lakhau, Rajasthan, a village in Churu district, Rajasthan, India